Prayssas is a commune in the Lot-et-Garonne department in south-western France. 
Prayssas and the surrounding area has a significant British population.

See also
Communes of the Lot-et-Garonne department

References

Communes of Lot-et-Garonne